The Ambassador of the United Kingdom to Iceland is the United Kingdom's foremost diplomatic representative in Iceland, and head of the UK's diplomatic mission in Iceland. There official title is His Britannic Majesty's Ambassador to the Republic of Iceland.

Both the British embassy and the ambassador's residence are in Reykjavík. The British embassy shares a site and several common facilities with the German embassy.

History
The UK's first representative to Iceland was appointed during the Second World War. Until then, Iceland had been a dependency of Denmark and then, since 1918, a sovereign state in a personal union with Denmark, with Denmark handling Icelandic foreign policy. On 9 April 1940 Nazi Germany invaded Denmark and the British Minister, Charles Smith, who had been appointed only six months previously, and his staff were expelled. Immediately, Iceland declared itself responsible for its own foreign affairs, and declared strict neutrality.

To prevent the emergence of a pro-Nazi government in Reykjavík, and help fight the Battle of the Atlantic, the United Kingdom occupied Iceland on 10 May 1940. With the British troops, Charles Howard Smith arrived as envoy to the Icelandic government. Smith died in his post in 1942, and was replaced by Gerald Shepherd (later Sir Gerald) the following year. In 1944, still at the height of the war, Iceland declared its full independence from Denmark.

Although the diplomatic mission in Iceland is not a large one, nor particularly prestigious, its importance during the Cold War was disproportionate, due to its strategic location in the North Atlantic. More crucial to British interests was the string of diplomatic and economic disputes related to fishing rights, which culminated in the Cod Wars.

List of heads of mission

Envoy Extraordinary and Minister Plenipotentiary
1940–1942: Charles Howard Smith
1943–1947: Sir Gerald Shepherd
1947–1950: Charles Baxter
1950–1953: John Greenway
1953–1956: James Henderson
1956–1957: Andrew Gilchrist

Ambassador Extraordinary and Plenipotentiary
1957–1959: Andrew Gilchrist
1959–1962: Charles Stewart
1962–1965: Basil Boothby
1966–1970: Aubrey Halford-MacLeod
1970–1975: John McKenzie
1975–1981: Kenneth East
1981–1983: William McQuillan	
1983–1986: Richard Thomas
1986–1989: Mark Chapman
1989–1991: Sir Richard Best
1991–1993: Patrick Wogan
1993–1996: Michael Hone
1996–2000: James McCulloch
2001–2004: John Culver
2004–2008: Alp Mehmet
2008–2012: Ian Whitting
2012–2016: Stuart Gill
2016–2021: Michael Nevin

August 2021–: Bryony Mathew

References

External links
UK and Iceland, gov.uk

Iceland
United Kingdom